Glemminge may refer to:

Glemminge, an old name for Glemmen municipality, Østfold county, Norway
Glemminge, a former municipality in Kristianstad county, Sweden